The Facciola's sorcerer (Facciolella oxyrhyncha), also known as the Facciola sorcerer in Uruguay is an eel in the family Nettastomatidae (duckbill/witch eels). It was described by Cristoforo Bellotti in 1883. It is a marine, subtropical eel which is known from the eastern Atlantic Ocean, including southern Portugal, Angola, and the Ligurian and Tyrrhenian seas. It dwells at a depth range of 30–731 metres; the young are known to inhabit caves, in which the larger specimens are found deeper. Males can reach a maximum standard length of 64.9 centimetres.

The Facciola's sorcerer's diet consists of decapod crustaceans in the taxon Natantia.

References

Nettastomatidae
Fish described in 1883